Enrique Iglesia Reina (born Folkestone, 2 October 1971) is an English former professional footballer who played as a forward in the Football League for Brentford.

Football career 
Reina began his career with non-League club Folkestone Invicta, before moving to Dover Athletic and then to Brentford in September 1997, for a £50,000 fee. He made 9 appearances for the Second Division club, but was forced to retire from professional football due to a knee injury in April 1998. Reina returned to Dover Athletic for the 1998–99 season and later played for Ramsgate and Folkestone Invicta, before retiring at the end of the 2001–02 season.

Rowing 
Reina has been active in endurance rowing. In February 2016, he and partner John Wilson set heavyweight world records in the age 40–49 category in Tandem Longest Continual Row and Tandem Million Meters. In February 2019, the pair completed an 89-day row between Spain and Antigua.

Personal life 
In 2003, Reina set up Reina Group, a Folkestone-based heating and plumbing services company.

Honours 
 Folkestone Invicta Supporters' Player of the Year: 1992–93

Career statistics

References

1971 births
Living people
People from Folkestone
English footballers
Association football forwards
Dover Athletic F.C. players
Brentford F.C. players
English Football League players
National League (English football) players
Folkestone Invicta F.C. players
Sing Tao SC players
Hong Kong First Division League players
English expatriate footballers
Expatriate footballers in Hong Kong
Southern Football League players
Ramsgate F.C. players
English expatriate sportspeople in Hong Kong